Ralph Edward "Hap" Myers (April 8, 1887 – June 30, 1967) was a Major League Baseball first baseman.

In five seasons Myers played in 377 games and posted a .268 batting average (335-for-1251) with 203 runs, 4 home runs, 116 RBI, 132 stolen bases and 119 walks. Defensively, he recorded a .987 fielding percentage as a first baseman.

External links

1887 births
1967 deaths
Major League Baseball first basemen
Baseball players from California
Boston Red Sox players
St. Louis Browns players
Boston Braves players
Brooklyn Tip-Tops players
California Golden Bears baseball players
Sacramento Sacts players
San Jose Prune Pickers players
Louisville Colonels (minor league) players
Jersey City Skeeters players
San Francisco Seals (baseball) players